Ricardo del Real (formerly Mónica del Real; born 5 September 1974) is a Mexican taekwondo practitioner, born in Aguascalientes. He competed at the 2000 Summer Olympics in Sydney. In 2019, he came out as a trans man.

References

External links

1974 births
Living people
Olympic taekwondo practitioners of Mexico
Taekwondo practitioners at the 2000 Summer Olympics
Pan American Games medalists in taekwondo
Pan American Games gold medalists for Mexico
Taekwondo practitioners at the 1995 Pan American Games
World Taekwondo Championships medalists
Medalists at the 1995 Pan American Games
Mexican LGBT sportspeople
Mexican male taekwondo practitioners
People from Aguascalientes City
Sportspeople from Aguascalientes
20th-century Mexican people